Casta Diva is a 1954 Italian-French biographical melodrama film directed by Carmine Gallone. It is a remake of Gallone's 1935 film with the same name.

Plot 
The film tells the fictionalized biography of the famous musician Vincenzo Bellini, who lived in the 19th century and died at the age of 34.

Cast 
 Antonella Lualdi as Maddalena Fumaroli
 Nadia Gray as Giuditta Pasta
 Maurice Ronet as Vincenzo Bellini
 Fausto Tozzi as Gaetano Donizetti
 Jacques Castelot as Ernesto Tosi
 Marina Berti as Beatrice Turina
 Renzo Ricci as Giudice Fumaroli
 Jean Richard as Fiorillo
 Paola Borboni as Miss Monti
 Lauro Gazzolo as Domenico Barbaja
 Danilo Berardinelli as Niccolò Paganini
 Renzo Giovampietro as Saverio Mercadante
 Camillo Pilotto as Rettore Conservatorio
 Luigi Tosi as Felice Romani
 Dante Maggio as Il pazzariello
 Nino Vingelli as Il guappo

References

External links
 

1954 romantic drama films
Italian romantic drama films
Films directed by Carmine Gallone
Films with screenplays by Age & Scarpelli
Biographical films about musicians
Remakes of Italian films
Films about composers
Films about classical music and musicians
Cultural depictions of classical musicians
Cultural depictions of Niccolò Paganini
Cultural depictions of Italian men
1954 films
Italian historical films
1950s historical films
French historical films
Films set in the 19th century
Melodrama films
1950s Italian films
1950s French films
Italian-language French films